Phragmataecia pacifica is a species of moth of the family Cossidae. It is found in Russia, the Caucasus and Dagestan.

The length of the forewings is about 18.5 mm. The forewings are brown with a dense suffusion of grey scales throughout. The hindwings are grey, except for a yellowish basal area.

References

Moths described in 2007
Phragmataecia